Zaido: Pulis Pangkalawakan (International title: Zaido: The Space Sheriff / ) is a Philippine television drama science fiction series broadcast by GMA Network. The series is a spin-off of the Japanese Metal Hero series Space Sheriff Shaider. Directed by Dominic Zapata, it stars Dennis Trillo, Marky Cielo and Aljur Abrenica. A special  Zaido: Ang Bagong Alamat (The New Legend) – The Making of Zaido aired on September 22, 2007. It premiered on September 24, 2007 on the network's Telebabad line up replacing Impostora. The series concluded on February 8, 2008 with a total of 100 episodes. It was replaced by Joaquin Bordado in its timeslot.

Cast and characters

Lead cast
 Dennis Trillo as Gallian Magdalion / Zaido Blue
 Marky Cielo as Alexis Lorenzo / Zaido Green
 Aljur Abrenica as Cervano Torres / Zaido Red

Supporting cast
 Lorna Tolentino as Helen Lorenzo / Shanara
 Raymart Santiago as Alvaro Lorenzo / Azur / Gamma
 Tirso Cruz III as Ramiro
 Diana Zubiri as Carmela Langit / Arianna
 Jay Manalo as Drigo
 Ian de Leon as Zion
 Paolo Ballesteros as Ida
 Lovi Poe as Mona Langit
 Dion Ignacio as Thor Mentor
 Karel Marquez as Lyka
 LJ Reyes as Lila / Debbie
 Iwa Moto as Itim / Sonia Tamano
 Kris Bernal as Amy Maltayra
 Melissa Avelino as Rosas / Marla
 Arci Muñoz as Puti / Stacy
 Vaness del Moral as Kahel / Rhea
 Tiya Pusit as Angge Mentor
 Spanky Manikan / John Feir as Eng
 Pinky Amador as Armida
 Ricardo Cepeda as Nalax King
 Richard Quan as Danny Torres
 Lovely Rivero as Mrs. Torres

Guest cast
 Chariz Solomon as Gayke
 Jacob Rica as Gelo Torres / Zaido Kid Red
 Pauleen Luna as Lyvia
 Isabel Granada as Luna
 Robert Villar as Oggy Lorenzo / Zaido Kid Green
 JM Reyes as Aqualia / Zaido Kid Blue
 Charisse Hermoso as Ave / Zaido Kid Yellow
 Charlotte Hermoso as Vea / Zaido Kid Pink
 Nicole Dulalia as Ida Dida
 Patricia Ysmael as Fasullo / Inday
 Paulo Avelino as Cervano's buddy
 Ken Punzalan as Cervano's buddy
 Vivo Ouano as Cervano's buddy
 Karen delos Reyes as Ederlyn
 Lifernand as Dodong
 Gio Alvarez as Giggle / Giga-wiga
 Sandy Talag as young Sharina
 Gian Carlos as Toby Mendoza / Zaido Gold Shadow
 Dexter Doria as Selma
 Jana Roxas as Sharina, young Helen Lorenzo
 Ryan Yllana as Tabatino
 Alex Crisano as Vola
 Mura as Buboy
 Louie Alejandro as Izcaruz
 Al Tantay as Alberto Lorenzo
 Tai Tomoyuki as Shigeki

Voice cast
 Tirso Cruz III as Kuuma Le-ar
 Vincent Gutierrez as Shaider
 Noel Urbano as Ulla
 Jeffrey Tam as Robix

Reception

Ratings
According to AGB Nielsen Philippines' Mega Manila household television ratings, the pilot episode of Zaido: Pulis Pangkalawakan earned a 34.6% rating. While the final episode scored a 32.3% rating.

Critical response
The series received negative reviews from critics. Entertainment critic Nestor Torre viewed that Zaido's visual effects felt "borrowed" from iconic references such as Star Wars. He also cited the inconsistency between the series' glossy sci-fi effects and the dated martial arts fight scenes and sword fights saying that "an advanced civilization would have had an equally high-tech warfare, as well as some distracting details in production design."

In the February 2008 issue of Otaku USA, the Tokyoscope R5 Central column called Zaido the "Tokusatsu version of Passions" saying "It's like GMA Network just wanted to make yet another soap opera but slapped Shaider on just to get ratings."

References

External links
 

2007 Philippine television series debuts
2008 Philippine television series endings
Fantaserye and telefantasya
Fictional police officers
Filipino-language television shows
GMA Network drama series
Martial arts television series
Metal Hero Series
Philippine science fiction television series
Philippine television series based on non-Philippine television series